Konstanty Zamoyski (9 April 1799 - 9 January 1866) was a Polish nobleman (szlachcic).

Konstanty became the 13th Ordynat of Zamość estate and was Chamberlain on the royal court in Russia. Since 1834 he has been a member of the State Commission for Debt Service of the Congress Poland. He married Princess Aniela Sapieha on 19 April 1827. He passed the law of antiquity in Poland. The law was repealed soon after his death.

1799 births
1866 deaths
Konstanty